A101, A.101 or A-101 may refer to :
 A101 road (England) or Rotherhithe Tunnel, road tunnel crossing beneath the River Thames in East London
 Russian route A130, formerly A101, road from Moscow to the border of Belarus through Roslavl
 AS-101, the first Saturn rocket launch to carry a Boilerplate Apollo spacecraft in 1964
 Aero A.101, a 1930s Czechoslovakian biplane light bomber and reconnaissance aircraft
 Agusta A.101, a 1964 Italian large prototype transport helicopter
 A101 (company), a Turkish chain market